Daniel Norbe (born August 22, 1995) is a Swedish professional ice hockey defenceman. He is currently playing with Södertälje SK of the Hockeyallsvenskan (Allsv).

Norbe made his Swedish Hockey League (SHL) debut playing with HV71 during the 2014–15 SHL season.

References

External links

1995 births
Living people
IF Björklöven players
HV71 players
Karlskrona HK players
Swedish ice hockey defencemen
Tingsryds AIF players
People from Växjö
Sportspeople from Kronoberg County